Rachael Robertson is a former British television continuity announcer and presenter.

Robertson began her career with Grampian Television (now STV North) in the mid-1990s as a staff announcer and newsreader for Grampian Headlines, replacing Tracey Crawford, who had left to join Granada. She also presented a number of regional programmes for the station including The Birthday Spot, The Scottish Tourism Supreme Awards and the BAFTA-nominated Saturday morning children's magazine show Wize Up, alongside announcing colleagues Scott Brown and Kate Fraser. Following the Scottish Media Group's takeover of Grampian in 1997, Robertson featured as a reporter for Scottish Television's long-running travel show, Scottish Passport.

Robertson left Grampian when the station closed down its Aberdeen-based presentation department in 1998 and soon became an announcer for BBC1 and BBC2. She left the BBC in December 2003. Robertson is no longer working in television.

References

Living people
Radio and television announcers
Scottish television presenters
Scottish women television presenters
Year of birth missing (living people)